This list comprises all players who participated in at least one league match for Cary Clarets (formerly Cary RailHawks U23s, Raleigh Elite and Raleigh CASL Elite) from the team's first season in the USL Premier Development League in 2002 until their last in 2009. Players who were on the roster but never played a first team game are not listed; players who appeared for the team in other competitions (US Open Cup, etc.) but never actually made an USL appearance are noted at the bottom of the page where appropriate.

A
  Brian Ackley
  Olukorede Aiyegbusi
  Matt Allen
  Matthew Avren

B
  Richard Baltz
  Darrius Barnes
  Zachary Barnett
  Brent Beavan
  Cass Beltz
  Ryan Bennett
  Stephen Bickford
  Russell Bienes
  Corben Bone
  David Boole
  Ronnie Bouemboue
  Justin Branch
  Cameron Brown
  Evan Brown
  Matt Brown
  David Buehler
  Kristopher Byrd

C
  Sol Caceres
  Michael Callahan
  Blake Camp
  Ian Carey
  Devan Carroll
  Lee Catchpole
  Chris Catlett
  Tomasz Charowski
  Chiedu Chukwumah
  El-Hadj Cisse
  William Clark
  Bart Creasman
  Steven Curfman
  Adam Currey

D
  Mamadou Danso
  Brad Darby
  Ryan Deter
  Ernesto DiLaudo
  Thomas Drake
  Alec Dufty

F
  Jeffrey Favitta
  Akira Fitzgerald
  Michael Fortier
  Michael Fragakis
  Raymond Fumo
  Santiago Fusilier

G
  Denis Geoffrey
  Joe Germanese
  Rami Ghanayem
  Jordan Graye
  Mike Grella
  Cole Grossman
  Willy Guadarrama
  Henry Gutierrez

H
  Brooks Haggerty
  Michael Harrington
  Robby Hoak
  Stephen Hollinger
  Jordan Howard
  Kirk Hudgins
  Justin Hughes

I
  Christian Ibeagha
  John Izzo

J
  Khalil Johnson
  Ryan Johnson

K
  Abdul Kargloo
  Aaron King
  Abdul Korgbo

L
  Tyler Lassiter
  Garry Lewis
  Chris Loftus
  Michael Longo
  Corey Lugger

M
  Benjamin Maxwell
  Daniel Miller
  Nicholas Millington
  Bryan Minogue
  Christopher Mobley
  Matthew Moore
  Gary Muir

N
  Nahum Navas
  Bryan Newbold
  Keith Nicholson
  Chris Norbet

O
  Conor O'Brien
  Ted Odgers
  Bryan O'Neil
  Ike Opara
  Kenny Orelaja

P
  Alberto Peralta-Ramos
  Jayson Perez
  Chase Perfect
  Paul Pessina
  Vince Petrasso
  Grant Porter
  Orry Powers

Q
  John Queeley

R
  Marcus Rein
  Chris Rodd

S
  Bryant Salter
  Alan Sanchez
  Aaron Sanders
  Sean Sassano
  Zack Schilawski
  Billy Schuler
  Gregory Schwartzenberger
  Mike Shaughness
  Andre Sherard
  Keith Shevlin
  Brian Shriver
  Clyde Simms
  Barry Slagle
  Blake Smith
  Ryan Solle
  Chad Steuck
  Kevin Stevenson

T
  Jan Trnka-Amrhein
  Nicholas Tsipis

V
  Julian Valentin
  Michael Videira

W
  Spencer Wadsworth
  Ville Wahlsten
  Greg Walters
  Michael Walters
  Aaron Weandt
  Nate Weiss
  Aaron West
  Macgregor Wilkie
  Ford Williams
  Justin Willis
  Philip Wilson
  Joel Wisdo
  Joey Worthen
  Justin Wyatt

Sources
 

Cary Clarets
 
Association football player non-biographical articles